Baleh may refer to:
 Baleh, Kurdistan (بله - Baleh)
 Baleh, Sarawak
 Baleh (state constituency), represented in the Sarawak State Legislative Assembly